Ahlborn is the surname of:
 Ania Ahlborn, Polish novelist
 August Ahlborn (1796–1857), German landscape painter active in Italy
 Dirk Ahlborn, American entrepreneur
 Lea Ahlborn (1826–1897), Swedish artist and first woman to serve as royal printmaker

See also
 Arkansas Department of Human Services v. Ahlborn, 2006 U.S. Supreme Court case
 Ahlborn-Galanti, U.S. organ manufacturer